SS Wexford was a steel-hulled, propeller-driven, cargo ship built by William Doxford & Sons. at Sunderland, Great Britain in 1883. The official number for Wexford was 87342 with the hull number 00145. The ship was lost on Lake Huron with all hands on 9 November 1913 during the Great Lakes storm of 1913. Sources cite conflicting numbers for crew lost with 17 to 24 crew being listed. Her cargo at the time of loss was 96,000 bushels of wheat.
A copper wreath was placed on the wreck to honor the crew of the 100th Anniversary of The Great Storm of 1913.

Ownership
Wexford was owned by a number of parties during her service life. Wexford was renamed Elise from 1898 to 1903. She was renamed Wexford in 1903. At the time of the sinking the ship was owned by the Western Steamship Company.

References

External links
 Historical Collections of the Great Lakes
 Boatnerds.com
 Toronto World - 14 November 1913 p. 3

Shipwrecks of Lake Huron
Maritime incidents in 1913
1883 ships
Ships built on the River Wear
Ships lost with all hands